Alex Bolt and Andrew Whittington won the title, beating Brydan Klein and Dane Propoggia 7–6(7–2), 6–3

Seeds

Draw

Draw

References
 Main Draw

Canberra Tennis International - Men's Doubles
2015 in Australian tennis
2015